Cyperus schaffneri is a species of sedge that is endemic to Mexico.

The species was first formally described by the botanist Johann Otto Boeckeler in 1878.

See also 
 List of Cyperus species

References 

schaffneri
Taxa named by Johann Otto Boeckeler
Plants described in 1878
Flora of Mexico